{{Infobox film
| name           = A Little Night Music
| image          = A Little Night Music film poster.jpg
| alt            = 
| caption        = Theatrical release poster
| director       = Harold Prince
| producer       = Elliott Kastner
| screenplay     = Hugh Wheeler
| based_on       = A Little Night Musicby Hugh WheelerSmiles of a Summer Night'by Ingmar Bergman
| starring       = Elizabeth TaylorDiana RiggLen CariouLesley-Anne Down
| music          = Stephen SondheimJonathan Tunick
| cinematography = Arthur Ibbetson
| editing        = John Jympson
| studio         = Sascha-VerleihS&T-Film Berlin
| distributor    = New World Pictures
| released       = 
| runtime        = 124 minutes
| country        = United StatesWest GermanyAustria
| language       = English
| budget         = $6 million or $7.2 million
}}A Little Night Music (Das Lächeln einer Sommernacht) is a 1977 American–West German–Austrian musical comedy film directed by Harold Prince. The film is an adaptation of the 1973 musical A Little Night Music, which in turn is based on Ingmar Bergman's 1955 film, Smiles of a Summer Night. The film stars Elizabeth Taylor, Diana Rigg, and Lesley-Anne Down. It also features Len Cariou, Hermione Gingold, and Laurence Guittard who reprised their Broadway roles. The film serves as Prince's second and final feature film as director.

Plot
In a town in a Austria at the turn of the 20th century, Frederich Egerman, a widower, works as a successful lawyer but is struggling with his marriage to Anne, his 18-year-old second wife. Anne nervously has protected her virginity for the first 11 months of marriage, though she continues to tell Fredrick she will be ready to make love to him for the first time "soon". Frederich's son (from his first marriage) Erich is studying to be a member of the church. However, Erich has been lusting after Anne, whom he is only one year older than her. In an effort to please his wife, Frederich purchases tickets to a play touring through the city. The play stars Desiree Armfeldt, a very renowned actress and Frederich's old flame from 14 years ago, and when the lock eyes in the theatre, Anne becomes aggravated and demands to leave. After the play, Fredrick and Desiree reunite in her dressing room.

While Desiree tours around Europe in play after play, her 14 year old daughter, Fredericka, lives with Desiree's mother, Madame Armfeldt, in her estate in the country. Madame Armfeldt does not approve of the actress lifestyle her daughter lives but she does not push the matter any further. Instead, she teaches Fredrika all the things she missed out on during her childhood touring with her mother.

Desiree, who is getting tired of her life, is thinking of settling down, and sets her sights on Frederich, despite his marriage. But when Desiree's own married lover Count Carl-Magnus Mittelheim arrives at her dressing room, he goes toe-to-toe with Frederich. Desiree lies and tells Carl-Magnus that Frederich is Madame Armfeldt's personal lawyer and we were just dropping off some documents for Desiree to sign. However, Carl-Magnus does not believe this for one minute. He reports the encounter to his wife Charlotte and tells her to visit Anne Egerman (who she knows through her younger sister) to expose the affair. Charlotte indeed does tell Anne about her husband and Desiree but Anne chooses not to confront Frederich.

Desiree persuades her mother to invite the Egermans to her country estate for the weekend so that Desiree can convince Frederich to leave Anne to be with her. Upon receiving the invitation, Anne is insulted and refuses the offer. However, Charlotte tells her it would be in her best interest to accept and sabotage Desiree's attempts at seducing Fredrick. Anne accepts the invitation but once Carl-Magnus gets wind of the weekend in the country, he makes it his mission to go and challenge Fredrick to a dual. The Egermans (Frederich, Anne, Erich and their maid Petra) along with the Mittelheims all drive out to the estate.

Everyone arrives at Madame Armfeldt's estate and Desiree is shocked to see Carl-Magnus and his wife have arrived. She invites everyone to stay despite the complications this presents. Charlotte tells Anne that she intends to flirt openly with Frederich in an effort to make her own husband jealous. Erich confides in Fredericka that he is in love with his step-mother but cannot do anything about it.

At dinner, tensions rise with Charlotte and Desiree throwing jabs at each other and Charlotte overtly flirting with Frederich. Erich calls everyone out for their absurd behavior before running outside to kill himself. However, Fredericka tells Anne the truth about Erich's love for her and she stops him from committing suicide. The two passionately kiss before deciding to run away with each other.

In the privacy of her bedroom, Desiree attempts her intentions to Frederich and confesses how much she wants to be with him. While Frederich does admit there is a part of him that wants to be with Desiree, he cannot bring himself to leave Anne. Desiree is heartbroken by this and Frederich gallantly offers to leave. However, upon meeting up with a sorrowful Charlotte in the gardens, Frederich and Charlotte witness Anne and Erich run off together. Charlotte consoles Frederich  but when Carl-Magnus sees this interaction, he jumps to conclusions and challenges Frederich to a game of Russian Roulette.

Despite being the one to get the loaded chamber, Frederich only grazes his ear with the bullet. Desiree runs to his side while Charlotte and Carl-Magnus decide to return home together. Frederich tells Desiree about seeing his son and Anne run off together and agrees to be with Desiree.

Cast
 Elizabeth Taylor as Desiree Armfeldt
 Diana Rigg as Charlotte Mittelheim
 Len Cariou as Frederich Egerman
 Lesley-Anne Down as Anne Egerman
 Hermione Gingold as Madame Armfeldt
 Laurence Guittard as Count Carl-Magnus Mittelheim
 Christopher Guard as Erich Egerman
 Lesley Dunlop as Petra
 Heinz Marecek as Frid
 Chloe Franks as Fredericka Armfeldt
 Jonathan Tunick as Conductor

Production
Music
Stephen Sondheim wrote the music and lyrics for the film. He wrote the lyrics for the "Night Waltz" theme ("Love Takes Time") and wrote an entirely new version of "The Glamorous Life", which has been incorporated into several subsequent productions of the stage musical.

Location
The setting for the film was moved from Sweden to Austria and was filmed on location. This location shift changed the name of Frederich's son from Henrik to Erich.

Release and reception
The film received mostly negative reviews, with much being made of Taylor's wildly fluctuating weight from scene to scene. Some critics talked more positively of the film, with Variety'' calling it "an elegant looking, period romantic charade". The film has received critical praise for Diana Rigg's performance. The film holds an 18% rating on Rotten Tomatoes based on eleven reviews.

Accolades
 Jonathan Tunick - Academy Award for Best Music, Original Song Score, and Its Adaptation or Best Adaptation Score (Won)
 Florence Klotz - Academy Award for Best Costume Design (Nominated)

Home media

A soundtrack was released on LP. In 2013, Masterworks Broadway released an expanded edition on compact disc featuring one previously unreleased stereo track prepared for the LP and three mono tracks taken directly from the film's soundtrack.

The film was, for a time, available on VHS and LaserDisc. A DVD release was issued in June 2007. A newer version of "The Glamorous Life" was included on the new remastered version of the Original Broadway Cast Recording.

References

External links
 
 
 

1977 films
1977 romantic comedy films
West German films
American romantic comedy films
Films about virginity
Films set in Austria
Films shot in Austria
English-language Austrian films
English-language German films
Films based on musicals based on films
American independent films
Films based on works by Ingmar Bergman
American remakes of Swedish films
1970s musical films
Films that won the Best Original Score Academy Award
German independent films
Austrian independent films
Films directed by Harold Prince
Films based on musicals
Films produced by Elliott Kastner
Films based on works by Stephen Sondheim
1970s English-language films
1970s American films